Trini Montero (1927 – 13 March 2012) was a Spanish film actress.

Selected filmography
 The Scandal (1943)
 The Guitar of Gardel (1949)
 I'm Not Mata Hari (1949)
 Captain Poison (1951)
 Devil's Roundup (1952)
 Policarpo (1959)
 Como dos gotas de agua (1963)

References

Bibliography 
 D'Lugo, Marvin. Guide to the Cinema of Spain. Greenwood Publishing, 1997.

External links 
 

1927 births
2012 deaths
Spanish film actresses
People from Madrid